Fear Nothing is a song by Belgian recording artist Selah Sue. It was written by Sue and Matt Schwartz for her second studio album Reason (2015), while production was helmed by the latter. Distributed by Warner Music Group, it was released as the album's fourth single by Because Music on December 10, 2015.

Weekly charts

References

External links
SelahSue.com – official website

2014 songs
2015 singles
Selah Sue songs
Because Music singles
Songs written by Matt Schwartz
Songs written by Selah Sue